Hemnes is a village in the municipality of Aurskog-Høland, Norway. Its population (2005) is 613. In Hemnes there is a school, Bråte Skole, which covers Løken, Momoen and Hemnes. Hemnes is located just east of Hemnes island (Hemnesøya) close to the North-East corner of the Hemnes lake (Hemnessjøen/Øgderen).

References

Villages in Akershus
Aurskog-Høland